Perittia eselkopensis is a moth in the family Elachistidae. It was described by Wolfram Mey in 2011. It is found in South Africa.

References

Moths described in 2011
Elachistidae
Moths of Africa